Bruce Frederich Beilfuss (January 8, 1915August 18, 1986) was an American lawyer and judge from Wisconsin.  He was the 22nd Chief Justice of the Wisconsin Supreme Court, serving from 1976 to 1983, and served 19 years on the Supreme Court prior to his time as chief justice.

Biography

Born in Withee, Wisconsin, Beilfuss graduated from Neillsville High School in 1932. Beilfuss then received his bachelors of economics (1936) and law (1938) degrees from the University of Wisconsin. He served on the Clark County, Wisconsin, Board of Supervisors and was district attorney of Clark County. During World War II, Beilfuss served in the United States Navy as a PT Boat Commander in the South Pacific. In 1953, Beilfuss was elected a Wisconsin Circuit Court judge. In 1963, he was elected to the Wisconsin Supreme Court, reelected in 1973 and became chief justice of the court in 1976, retiring in 1983.

Beilfuss was active outside the judiciary. He served as chair on the Board of Visitors of the University of Wisconsin Law School, was a member of the Veterans of Foreign Wars, the American Legion and a founder of the Dane County Big Brothers program.

References

External links
 

People from Clark County, Wisconsin
Military personnel from Wisconsin
University of Wisconsin–Madison College of Letters and Science alumni
University of Wisconsin Law School alumni
County supervisors in Wisconsin
Wisconsin state court judges
Chief Justices of the Wisconsin Supreme Court
1915 births
1986 deaths
20th-century American lawyers
20th-century American judges
20th-century American politicians
United States Navy personnel of World War II